The Bold and the Brave is a 1956 American World War II film written by Robert Lewin in his first screenplay based on some of his Italian Campaign experiences.  It was directed by Lewis R. Foster and stars Wendell Corey, Mickey Rooney, and Don Taylor. The film was produced by Filmmakers Production Organization and released by RKO.  The title song for was cowritten by Mickey Rooney and Ross Bagdasarian, the creator of Alvin and the Chipmunks.

Plot

The film traces the destinies of three American soldiers stationed in Italy during World War II. Fairchild (Corey) is an idealist who doesn't believe in killing. Preacher (Taylor) is a religious zealot, who can't see anything in terms other than Good and Evil. Dooley (Rooney), an inveterate gambler who runs a floating crap game up and down the Italian front.  A gambler and a World War II veteran himself, Rooney claimed to have adlibbed and directed his crap game sequence.

Cast 

 Wendell Corey as Fairchild
 Mickey Rooney as Dooley
 Don Taylor as Preacher
 Nicole Maurey as Fiamma
 John Smith as Smith
 Race Gentry as Hendricks
 Ralph Votrian as Wilbur
 Wright King as Technician Fifth Grade
 Stanley Adams as Master Sergeant
 Bobs Watson as Bob
 Tara Summers as Tina
 Diana Darrin as Lina

Award nominations
The film received the following Academy Awards nominations:
 Best Actor in a Supporting Role, Mickey Rooney, 1957 Academy Awards
 Best Writing, Best Screenplay - Original, 1957 Academy Awards

See also
List of American films of 1956

References

External links 
 

1956 films
1956 war films
American black-and-white films
American war films
Films directed by Lewis R. Foster
Films scored by Herschel Burke Gilbert
Italian Campaign of World War II films
RKO Pictures films
1950s English-language films
1950s American films